Zadura is a surname. Notable people with this surname include:

 Bohdan Zadura (born 1945), Polish poet and translator
 Małgorzata Zadura (born 1982), Polish hammer thrower
 Przemysław Zadura (born 1988), Polish handball player

See also
 

Polish-language surnames